Miconia setulosa is a species of plant in the family Melastomataceae. It is endemic to Peru & Bolivia.

References

Flora of Peru
Flora of Bolivia
setulosa
Vulnerable plants
Taxonomy articles created by Polbot
Taxa named by Alfred Cogniaux